Christopher McClain Smith (born April 15, 1969) is an American professional golfer who played on the PGA Tour and the Web.com Tour.

Smith was born in Indianapolis, Indiana, graduating from Rochester Community High School; during his sophomore season (1985), he was the Boys State High School Champion, in his senior season (1987), he finished as the state runner-up in the boys state golf championship. He was awarded the Fred Keesling Award following his high school career. He attended Ohio State University, where he completed a successful collegiate career. He won seven individual titles, including the 1990 Big Ten Championship, the 1991 Robert Kepler Intercollegiate and 5 other events. He was a four-time All-Conference selection in the Big Ten from 1988 to 1991; his other Big Ten Awards include the 1988 Freshman of the Year, the 1990 Player of the Year and the 1990 Les Bolstad Award for lowest stroke average. He was named an All-America selection in 1990 as a junior (honorable mention) and in 1991 as a senior (first team). Smith won the Indiana State Amateur Championship in 1990 and competed in the Sun Bowl Golf Classic in 1990. He was inducted into the Ohio State Varsity O Hall of Fame in 2000.

In 1997, Smith became the first golfer on the Nike Tour (now known as the Web.com Tour) to immediately move up to the PGA Tour by way of the "battlefield promotion", which is awarded to a player who wins three tournaments in one Nike Tour season. In 1997 he was named the Nike Tour Player of the Year and also led the money list.

Smith has won one tournament on the PGA Tour, the 2002 Buick Classic. Smith struggled on the PGA Tour after the win. Smith's best result on the PGA Tour since his sole win in 2002 was when he finished 3rd place at the 2004 Chrysler Classic of Greensboro.

On June 21, 2009, Smith's wife was killed in an automobile accident. His two children were also critically injured.

In 2013 Smith was inducted into the Indiana Golf Hall Of Fame and has been quite successful in the Indiana Golf Association. 

Smith held a share of the 54-hole lead at the 2015 Puerto Rico Open, but stumbled with a final-round 73 to finish T10. It was his first PGA Tour top-10 in ten years.

In 2018, Smith collected several professional wins on the Indiana Tour becoming the Indiana PGA Player of the Year. He also won the 2020 Indiana PGA Championship.

In 2022, Smith re-married and adopted his new wife’s children.

Amateur wins
1985 IHSAA Boys State Championship
1985 Indiana (Boys) State Junior
1986 Indiana (Boys) State Junior
1988 Western Junior
1990 Indiana State Amateur, Big Ten Championship (individual)
1991 Robert Kepler Intercollegiate
1988-91 Six additional intercollegiate events

Professional wins (14)

PGA Tour wins (1)

Buy.com Tour wins (5)

*Note: The 1995 Nike Gateway Classic was shortened to 54 holes due to rain.

Buy.com Tour playoff record (1–3)

Hooters Tour wins (1)
1994 Rintoul Open

Other wins (8)
1990 Indiana Match Play
1992 Ohio Open
1994 Ohio Open
2018 Indianapolis Open, Monticello Open, Indiana Section Tournament Series, Southern Open
2020 Indiana PGA Championship

Results in major championships

Note: Smith never played in the Masters Tournament.

CUT = missed the half-way cut
"T" = tied

Results in The Players Championship

CUT = missed the halfway cut

Results in World Golf Championships

"T" = Tied

See also
1995 Nike Tour graduates
1997 Nike Tour graduates
1998 PGA Tour Qualifying School graduates
2000 Buy.com Tour graduates
List of golfers with most Web.com Tour wins

References

External links

American male golfers
Ohio State Buckeyes men's golfers
PGA Tour golfers
Korn Ferry Tour graduates
Golfers from Indiana
Sportspeople from Indianapolis
1969 births
Living people